Tiago Retzlaff Nunes (born 15 February 1980) is a Brazilian football manager, currently in charge of Peruvian club Sporting Cristal.

Career
Born in Santa Maria, Rio Grande do Sul, Nunes was a youth player at hometown side Riograndense; initially a midfielder, he switched to central defender before ending his playing career due to a knee injury. He then began his career as a fitness coach in the early 2003, and worked at hometown side Inter de Santa Maria, Clube Atlético Camponovense, São Luiz-RS (two spells), Santo Ângelo, Pelotas, Bacabal, Luverdense (two spells) and Novo Horizonte.

Nunes' first managerial experience came in 2010, with Rio Branco-AC, where he won the year's Campeonato Acreano. In June, he became the assistant of Tarcísio Pugliese in the Série C.

On 7 November 2010, Nunes was appointed Luverdense manager in the place of departing Lisca, but was sacked after only three matches. He was subsequently in charge of Sapucaiense, Riograndense, Bagé and União Frederiquense before being named Grêmio's under-15 manager in 2013.

After working for Juventude, Brasília and Ferroviária's under-20 sides, Nunes was announced as São Paulo-RS manager on 3 May 2016. On 17 October, he was named at the helm of Veranópolis for the following campaign.

On 21 April 2017, Nunes joined Atlético Paranaense as manager of the under-19 squad. The following 4 January he was appointed manager of the under-23s, and won the year's Campeonato Paranaense. On 27 June 2018, he was named first-team interim manager in the place of Fernando Diniz.

Still an interim, Nunes led the club to an impressive run in the league, finishing seventh (two points shy of a Copa Libertadores qualification spot) and winning the 2018 Copa Sudamericana. On 11 January 2019, he signed a new one-year contract with the club, being definitely appointed as manager.

On 5 November 2019, Nunes was dismissed after accepting an offer from Corinthians. He was sacked on 11 September 2020 due to poor form and bad results.

On 21 April 2021, Nunes returned to Grêmio, being appointed first team manager in the place of longtime incumbent Renato Gaúcho. He was dismissed on 4 July, after seven winless league matches, and took over fellow top tier side Ceará on 30 August.

On 25 March 2022, after two eliminations in the Cearense and the Copa do Nordeste, Nunes was sacked. On 17 November, he was named manager of Sporting Cristal for the upcoming season.

Managerial statistics

Honours
Rio Branco-AC
 Campeonato Acreano: 2010

Athletico Paranaense
 Campeonato Paranaense: 2018
 Copa Sudamericana: 2018
 J.League Cup / Copa Sudamericana Championship: 2019
 Copa do Brasil: 2019

Grêmio
 Campeonato Gaúcho: 2021
 Recopa Gaúcha: 2021

References

External links
 
 

1980 births
Living people
People from Santa Maria, Rio Grande do Sul
Brazilian football managers
Campeonato Brasileiro Série A managers
Campeonato Brasileiro Série C managers
Campeonato Brasileiro Série D managers
Rio Branco Football Club managers
Luverdense Esporte Clube managers
Sport Club São Paulo managers
Veranópolis Esporte Clube Recreativo e Cultural managers
Club Athletico Paranaense managers
Sport Club Corinthians Paulista managers
Grêmio Foot-Ball Porto Alegrense managers
Ceará Sporting Club managers
Sporting Cristal managers
Sportspeople from Rio Grande do Sul
Brazilian expatriate football managers
Brazilian expatriate sportspeople in Peru
Expatriate football managers in Peru